The House of Dandolo was a patrician family of the Republic of Venice, which produced four Doges of Venice. The progenitor of the family was a merchant named Domenico. The family became more successful by the beginning of the 12th century.

Members

Early members
 
Domenico Dandolo (fl. 1085–June 1107), nobleman in San Luca
Pietro Dandolo
Bono Dandolo
Vitale Dandolo, jurist, ambassador to Ferrara and bailo in Constantinople
Enrico Dandolo (c. 1107–May 1205), Doge of Venice (1192–1205)
Raniero Dandolo (fl. 1204–42), admiral, Procurator and Vice-Doge
Anna Dandolo (fl. 1217), Queen of Serbia, third wife of King Stefan the First-Crowned
Enrico Dandolo (ca. 1100–1182), Patriarch of Grado
?
Giberto Dandolo (1220–1279), admiral
Giovanni Dandolo, Doge of Venice (1280–89)
?
Marino Dandolo

14th century
 
Andrea Dandolo, great-great-great grandson of Pietro Dandolo
Francesco Dandolo

15th century
Giovanna Dandolo, Dogaressa of Venice (1457–62)

16th century
Zilia Dandolo, Dogaressa of Venice (1556–59)
Matteo Dandolo, Ambassador of Venice (1549)

Modern family
Enrico Dandolo (patriot)
Emilio Dandolo
Giorgio Dandolo

See also
 Palazzo Dandolo
 Palazzo Dandolo Paolucci

References

Sources

External links

 
Republic of Venice families